Robert Allen Skotheim (born January 31, 1933) is an American educator who has served as president of several colleges and institutions.

Biography
In 1933, Skotheim was born to Sivert and Marjorie Skotheim, school teachers in West Seattle. He attended Fauntleroy School and West Seattle High School. He was educated at Princeton University, graduated with a B.A. in history from the University of Washington, and went on to obtain a Ph.D. from University of Washington Graduate School. In 1966, he was awarded a Guggenheim Fellowship and spent a year in France. Afterwards, he taught history at the University of Colorado, Boulder and then became provost of Hobart and William Smith College in Geneva, New York.

From 1975 to 1988, he served as the 10th president of Whitman College, where he led a $50 million capital campaign to increase the endowment and researched the history of the college. In 1988, after 12 years at Whitman, he became president at the Huntington Library. In June 1992, he announced a $4.5 million gift to the library endowment. On June 30, 2001, he stepped down from the Huntington.

On January 1, 2008, Skotheim assumed the role of interim president of Occidental College, replacing president Susan Westerberg Prager, who announced her intention to resign in mid-November.  During his tenure, Skotheim was one of the oldest college presidents in the nation.  On July 1, 2009, Skotheim stepped down and Jonathan Veitch, formerly dean of Eugene Lang College, took the reins.

Honors and legacy
The Nadine and Robert Skotheim Director of Education at The Huntington is endowed in his honor.

Personal life
On June 14, 1953, Skotheim married Nadine Esther Vail, in Seattle, Washington, and they had three children: Marjorie, Kris and Julie.

Awards 
In 2000, Skotheim was awarded an honorary Doctor of Humane Letters (L.H.D.) degree from Whittier College.

References

Selected publications

Books

Articles

Video

External links
 Press release: Robert Skotheim Named President of Occidental College. Occidental College. December 18, 2007.
 Robert A. Skotheim Papers, 1975-2002. Archives West. Orbis Cascade Alliance.

1933 births
Living people
Presidents of Occidental College
Presidents of Whitman College
People associated with the Huntington Library
Princeton University alumni
University of Washington alumni
University of Colorado faculty
Hobart and William Smith Colleges faculty
Intellectual historians
21st-century American historians
21st-century American male writers
Writers from Seattle
20th-century American educators
Historians from Washington (state)
American male non-fiction writers